is a Japanese guitarist and composer.

Life
He started to play acoustic guitar aged 12, inspired by British folk music from the likes of Bert Jansch, and later the work of Frank Zappa and Andy Partridge. In 1986 he formed the band Tipographica, with saxophonist Naruyoshi Kikuchi and jazz pianist Akira Minakami. After four albums, the group disbanded in 1996. In the 90s he formed the instrumental trio MEATOPIA with Tadahiko Yokogawa of 4-D mode1 and P-MODEL & Osamu Matsumoto. They released one self-titled album under this band in 1993.

After providing the soundtrack to Gungrave for PlayStation 2 in 2002, the concept was subsequently developed into an anime series, also scored by Imahori. In addition to scoring the anime series, Imahori composed the music for Gungrave's 2004 video game sequel Gungrave: Overdose, also for the PS2. He is perhaps best known in the US as the composer of several anime soundtracks, primarily Trigun, Gungrave and Hajime no Ippo, though he has also contributed tracks to Texhnolyze, Wolf's Rain, and Cowboy Bebop. He has worked with Yoshida Tatsuya of Ruins fame, and also with Yoko Kanno as a member of The Seatbelts.

See also
 An Music School

References

External links
Tipographica homepage (Japanese)
English version of the Tipographica homepage

1962 births
20th-century Japanese guitarists
20th-century Japanese male musicians
21st-century Japanese guitarists
21st-century Japanese male musicians
Anime composers
Japanese composers
Japanese film score composers
Japanese male composers
Japanese male film score composers
Japanese rock guitarists
Living people
Video game composers